Salt River Township is one of ten townships in Adair County, Missouri, United States. As of the 2010 census, its population was 1,043. Salt River Township was named from one its principal streams.

Geography
It contains two cemeteries: Brashear and Paultown.

The streams of Battle Creek, Brushy Fork, Hog Branch, Lost Creek, Steer Creek and Timber Branch run through this township.

References

 USGS Geographic Names Information System (GNIS)

External links
 US-Counties.com
 City-Data.com

Townships in Adair County, Missouri
Kirksville micropolitan area, Missouri
Townships in Missouri